Livingston Compagnia Aerea (English: Livingston Airline, officially New Livingston S.p.A.) was an Italian airline with its head office in Cardano al Campo and main hub at Milan Malpensa Airport in Milan. It ceased operations on 7 October 2014.

History 
Livingston Compagnia Aerea was founded by taking over the name, the landing rights and some other assets from the liquidation process of the former Livingston Energy Flight. The airline started with charter operations across Europe.

After the Italian low-cost company Wind Jet collapsed in August 2012, Livingston announced that it would take over several routes of Wind Jet's. As of December 2013 it had not been announced whether these temporary flights will be continued. On 27 October 2013, the airline took over Alitalia on the Alghero, Sardinia to Rome, Italy route with three daily flights.

On 25 June 2014 ENAC announced that the AOC for Livingston would be suspended effective on 14 July 2014 due to financial troubles. This decision was revoked a few days later, the airline meanwhile continued its operations.

However, as of 7 October 2014, Livingston ceased all operations and returned their planes to the lessors. One day later, the Italian authorities revoked the airline's operating license.

Fleet 

As of October 2014, Livingston Compagnia Aerea fleet consisted of the following aircraft which since has been returned to their lessors:

Historical Fleet

Destinations 
This is the network of scheduled destinations that was operated by Livingston as of summer 2014 destinations and planned winter 2014/2015 scheduled and charter destinations before the shutdown of operations.

See also 
Transport in Italy
List of airports in Italy
List of companies of Italy

References

External links 

Company Profile

Defunct airlines of Italy
Airlines established in 2011
Airlines disestablished in 2014